Beaujolais is a French Appellation d'Origine Contrôlée wine generally made of the Gamay grape which has a thin skin and is low in tannins.

Beaujolais may also refer to:

 Beaujolais (grape), a red French wine grape variety
 Beaujolais (province), France
 Beaujolais, the second song on the 1985 The Alan Parsons Project album Stereotomy
 Gamay Beaujolais, a clone of pinot noir